Broadcasters for the Kansas City Royals Major League Baseball team.

Radio

Lead play-by-play
Buddy Blattner (1969–1975; deceased)
Denny Matthews (1969–present)

Secondary play-by-play
Fred White (1973–1998; deceased)
Ryan Lefebvre (1997–2007, 2012–present)
Bob Davis (2008–2012)
Steve Stewart (2008–present)
Steve Physioc (2012–2022)
Jake Eisenberg (2023–present)

Color analyst
Rex Hudler (2012-present)
Jeff Montgomery (2017–present)

Television

Play-by-play
Buddy Blattner (1969–1975)
Denny Matthews (1969–1976, 1983–1987)
Steve Shannon (1977–1979)
Al Wisk (1980–1982)
Denny Trease (1980–1992)
Fred White (1973–1976, 1983–1987)
Dave Armstrong (1993–1995)
Steve Busby (1996)
Bob Davis (1997–2007)
Ryan Lefebvre (2008–present)
Steve Physioc (2012–2022)
Jake Eisenberg (2023–present)

Color analyst
Paul Splittorff (1988–2011; deceased)
John Wathan (1996–1997)
Frank White (2008–2011)
Rex Hudler (2012–present)
Jeff Montgomery (2012–present)

See also
 List of current Major League Baseball announcers
 Fox Sports Kansas City

External links
Royals Broadcasting page

Kansas City Royals
 
Broadcasters
Fox Sports Networks
Bally Sports